E-Type or Type E or variation may refer to:

 E-type asteroid, an asteroid thought to have an enstatite achondrite surface
 Victorian Railways E type carriage, a wooden express train passenger carriage
 E-Type (musician), a Swedish musician
 Jaguar E-Type, a British sports car
 E-Type (video game), a 1989 driving video game named for the car
 Audi Type E, a German passenger car
 Type E power plug and socket
 e-Types, Danish brand agency

See also

 E (disambiguation)
 TE (disambiguation)
 E class (disambiguation)
 Model E (disambiguation)
 Type (disambiguation)